Lampyris iberica, the Iberian firefly, is a species of firefly. The species is endemic of the Iberian Peninsula and Southern France.

References

External links
 Gusanos de luz. ¿Has visto una luciérnaga? 

Lampyridae
Bioluminescent insects
Beetles described in 2008
Beetles of Europe